The Wheeling Wildcats were a professional indoor football team located in Wheeling, West Virginia. The team began play in the Continental Indoor Football League during the 2009 season as an expansion team. The Wildcats were the second indoor football team to be based in Wheeling. The team filled the void left by the demise of the Ohio Valley Greyhounds, who played their final down of football in 2007. The owner of the Wildcats was Dave Bender. The Wildcats played their home games at WesBanco Arena in Wheeling.

Franchise history
In March 2008, it was announced that indoor football would be returning to Wheeling, West Virginia. Owner Dave Bender was debating on putting the team in Elmira, New York, but when he saw the opportunity to Wheeling, he couldn't pass it up. Bender also cited that the location of teams in the league were a large part of why the Wildcats joined the CIFL. The team tried to establish rivalries, challenging the Rochester Raiders to play the Wildcats in the Raiders' first home game. However, the Raiders have since left the CIFL for the newly established Indoor Football League, leaving the challenge unanswerable. In August, the team announced the signing of head coach Shawn Liotta, who had been coaching the Erie RiverRats of the American Indoor Football Association. In December 2008, the Wildcats announced the signing of former University of Pittsburgh standout quarterback, Rod Rutherford. The team also signed former NFL and Arena Football League player, Robb Butler to play receiver. With both Rutherford and Butler player together for Liotta in Erie the year before, the team's offense had high expectations. The Wildcats, as well as the rest of the CIFL, had an opportunity to get a higher caliber player in 2009, as the Arena Football League suspending its 2010 season. The reason that many of the AFL players did not make it onto the Wildcats roster was largely that the players wanted more money than the CIFL would allow.

The Wildcats inaugural season began with a 55−47 road loss to the Marion Mayhem. Two weeks later, the Wildcats played their first home game against the Fort Wayne Freedom. The Freedom offense put on a good display, scoring on every drive except one, en route to defeating the Wildcats 49-34. The following week the Chicago Slaughter came to WesBanco Arena. The undefeated Slaughter had signed several of the Chicago Rush's players who were looking for a place to play with the AFL suspension. The Slaughter defeated the Wildcats 67-59. Four weeks into their season, the Wildcats were 0-4, and faced the also winless Miami Valley Silverbacks. The Wildcats were able to work out their first win against the traveling Silverbacks. The Wildcats defeated the Silverbacks again three weeks later to make their record 2–6. The Wildcats lost their remaining four games of the season to Marion, Rock River, Fort Wayne and Wisconsin. Despite having a good roster, including several NFL, AFL and division one college players, and David Dinkins (who had previously played for AIFA teams in Erie, Pennsylvania, and won the 2005 AIFA MVP), the Wildcats went 2-10 and folded after one season. Liotta, Rutherford and Dinkins returned to Erie in 2010.

Schedule

2009 CIFL Standings

Logos and uniforms
After deciding against using the Greyhounds name, and when "Ironmen" nickname (a nod to the city's former Continental Football League team) was unavailable, a naming contest was announced. Out of 175 entries, the name Wildcats was chosen.

Notable players

Roster

Head coaches

Season-by-season results

Sources

External links
 Wheeling Wildcats official website

American football teams in West Virginia
Former Continental Indoor Football League teams
Sports in Wheeling, West Virginia
American football teams established in 2008
American football teams disestablished in 2009
2008 establishments in West Virginia
2009 disestablishments in West Virginia